The Butterfly Mouse (La parpaja topola) is a dramatic monologue by Dario Fo.

Synopsis

A simple young goatherd was scared of women. In his valley lived a priest who was having a relationship with a young girl. The girl's mother came to see the priest and told him to desist - so the priest plotted to get the goatherd married to the girl, so that he might continue having his illicit relationship. However the goatherd and the girl find love.

Translations

An authorised English translation has been made by Ed Emery.

References

Plays by Dario Fo
Monologues